Seely Creek Township may refer to the following townships in the United States:

 Seely Township, Guthrie County, Iowa
 Seely Township, Faribault County, Minnesota

See also
 Seely
 Sealy Township, Logan County, North Dakota

Township name disambiguation pages